Philip is a masculine given name.

Philip or Phillip or Philipp may also refer to:

Places
 Phillip, Australian Capital Territory, Canberra
 Philip, South Dakota, United States
 Philipp, Mississippi, United States
 Phillip Island (disambiguation)
 Port Philip (disambiguation)

See also 

 
 Philipp, a surname and a given name
 Philipps, a surname
 Emperor Philip (disambiguation)
 Filip
 Fillip
 Filipp
 King Philip (disambiguation)
 Prince Philip (disambiguation)
 Phil (disambiguation)
 Phill
 Philippa
 Philippic
 Philippines
 Saint Philip (disambiguation)